Jaane Kahan Mera Jigar Gaya Ji is a TV drama broadcast on Sony Entertainment Television in 1997–1998.

The series is based on personal and professional lives of fictional people in the film world. The cast includes Bhavana Balsavar, Prashant Narayanan, Rituraj, Shweta Salve and other.

References

External links 
 

Sony Entertainment Television original programming
1997 Indian television series debuts
1998 Indian television series endings
Bollywood in fiction